William March (28 February 1925 – 1974) was an English footballer who played as a full-back.

March played in The Football League for Barnsley and Gateshead between 1951 and 1957 after playing in the Northern League with Ferryhill Athletic.

Sources

1925 births
1974 deaths
Sportspeople from Chester-le-Street
Footballers from County Durham
English footballers
Association football defenders
Barnsley F.C. players
Gateshead F.C. players
Northern Football League players
English Football League players
Ferryhill Athletic F.C. players